Harry Arthur Mahnken (July 15, 1903 – February 27, 1995) was an American football coach.  He served as the head football coach at Princeton University from 1943 to 1944, compiling a record of 2–8.  A native of Brooklyn, New York, Mahnken attended Springfield College in Springfield, Massachusetts, where he played football and baseball.

Head coaching record

References

External links
 
 

1903 births
1995 deaths
Baseball first basemen
Lawrence Merry Macks players
Princeton Tigers football coaches
Springfield Ponies players
Springfield Pride baseball players
Springfield Pride football players
Sportspeople from Brooklyn
Players of American football from New York City
Baseball players from New York (state)